Muhammad Tariq Imran (born 2 March 1977) is a Pakistani Olympian. He was born in Gojra district, Tobatek Singh Punjab, Pakistan. He is the son of hockey player Abdul Rehman Bhutta, and his brothers Liaqat Ali Bhutta and Asadullah Bhutta were also national level hockey players.

References

External links

 Pakistan Hockey Team
 Tariq Imran mentioned at PHF Website
 Olympics Athlete - Summer 2000

1977 births
Living people
Olympic field hockey players of Pakistan
Pakistani male field hockey players
Male field hockey defenders
1998 Men's Hockey World Cup players
2002 Men's Hockey World Cup players
Asian Games medalists in field hockey
Field hockey players at the 1998 Asian Games
Field hockey players at the 2000 Summer Olympics
Field hockey players at the 2002 Asian Games
Commonwealth Games medallists in field hockey
Commonwealth Games bronze medallists for Pakistan
Asian Games bronze medalists for Pakistan
Medalists at the 1998 Asian Games
Field hockey players at the 2002 Commonwealth Games
Medallists at the 2002 Commonwealth Games